Bernt Erik Christoffer Lindhe (born 1 February 1989) is a Swedish Paralympic swimmer. He is a triple World bronze medalist and has Swedish records in 50, 100 and 200 m freestyle swimming and 50 m butterfly stroke. He competed in the 2008 and 2012 Summer Paralympics.

Lindhe lost an arm and both of his legs in a train accident in the summer of 2006.

References

External links
Official website

1989 births
Living people
People from Ulricehamn Municipality
Paralympic swimmers of Sweden
Swimmers at the 2008 Summer Paralympics
Swimmers at the 2012 Summer Paralympics
Swedish amputees
Medalists at the World Para Swimming Championships
Swedish male freestyle swimmers
S4-classified Paralympic swimmers
Sportspeople from Västra Götaland County